Two ships of the Royal Navy have carried the name HMS Harvester:

  was a  minesweeping sloop launched 1918, sold for breaking up 1922.
  was a H-class destroyer ordered by the Brazilian navy as Jurua, purchased by the British before launch, launched as HMS Handy September 1939, renamed Harvester January 1940, sunk 1943.

Royal Navy ship names